Tris(bipyridine)ruthenium(II) chloride is the chloride salt coordination complex with the formula [Ru(bpy)3]2+ 2Cl−.  This polypyridine complex is a red crystalline salt obtained as the hexahydrate, although all of the properties of interest are in the cation [Ru(bpy)3]2+, which has received much attention because of its distinctive optical properties.  The chlorides can be replaced with other anions, such as PF6−.

Synthesis and structure

This salt is prepared by treating an aqueous solution of ruthenium trichloride with 2,2'-bipyridine.  In this conversion, Ru(III) is reduced to Ru(II), and hypophosphorous acid is typically added as a reducing agent. [Ru(bpy)3]2+ is octahedral, containing a central low spin d6 Ru(II) ion and three bidentate bpy ligands. The Ru-N distances are 2.053(2), shorter than the Ru-N distances for [Ru(bpy)3]3+.  The complex is chiral, with D3 symmetry.  It has been resolved into its enantiomers.  In its lowest lying triplet excited state the molecule is thought to attain lower C2 symmetry, as the excited electron is localized primarily on a single bipyridyl ligand.

Photochemistry of  [Ru(bpy)3]2+

[Ru(bpy)3]2+ absorbs ultraviolet and visible light. Aqueous solutions of [Ru(bpy)3]Cl2 are orange due to a strong MLCT absorption at 452 ± 3 nm (extinction coefficient of 14,600 M−1cm−1). Further absorption bands are found at 285 nm corresponding to ligand centered π*← π transitions and a weak transition around 350 nm (d-d transition). Light absorption results in formation of an excited state have a relatively long lifetime of 890 ns in acetonitrile  and 650 ns in water.  The excited state relaxes to the ground state by emission of a photon or non-radiative relaxation. The quantum yield is 2.8% in air-saturated water at 298 K and the emission maximum wavelength is 620 nm.  The long lifetime of the excited state is attributed to the fact that it is triplet, whereas the ground state is a singlet state and in part due to the fact that the structure of the molecule allows for charge separation.  Singlet-triplet transitions are forbidden and therefore often slow.

Like all molecular excited states, the triplet excited state of [Ru(bpy)3]2+ has both stronger oxidizing and reducing properties than its ground state.  This situation arises because the excited state can be described as an Ru3+ complex containing a bpy•− radical anion as a ligand.  Thus, the photochemical properties of [Ru(bpy)3]2+ are reminiscent of the photosynthetic assembly, which also involves separation of an electron and a hole.

[Ru(bpy)3]2+ has been examined as a photosensitizer for both the oxidation and reduction of water.  Upon absorbing a photon, [Ru(bpy)3]2+ converts to the aforementioned triplet state, denoted [Ru(bpy)3]2+*.  This species transfers an electron, located on one bpy ligand, to a sacrificial oxidant such as peroxodisulfate (S2O82−).  The resulting [Ru(bpy)3]3+ is a powerful oxidant and oxidizes water into O2 and protons via a catalyst.  Alternatively, the reducing power of [Ru(bpy)3]2+* can be harnessed to reduce methylviologen, a recyclable carrier of electrons, which in turn reduces protons at a platinum catalyst.  For this process to be catalytic, a sacrificial reductant, such as EDTA4− or triethanolamine is provided to return the Ru(III) back to Ru(II).

Derivatives of [Ru(bpy)3]2+ are numerous. Such complexes are widely discussed for applications in biodiagnostics, photovoltaics and organic light-emitting diode, but no derivative has been commercialized. Application of [Ru(bpy)3]2+ and its derivatives to fabrication of optical chemical sensors is arguably one of the most successful areas so far.

[Ru(bpy)3]2+ and photoredox catalysis 
Photoredox catalysis exploits [Ru(bpy)3]2+ as a sensitizer as a strategy for organic synthesis.  Many analogues of [Ru(bpy)3]2+ are employed as well. These transformations exploit the redox properties of [Ru(bpy)3]2+* and its reductively quenched derivative [Ru(bpy)3]+.

Safety
Metal bipyridine as well as related phenanthroline complexes are generally bioactive, as they can act as intercalating agents.

References

Ruthenium complexes
Photochemistry
Bipyridines
Ruthenium(II) compounds
Chlorides
Pyridine complexes